Franghiz Ali-Zadeh (Azerbaijani Firəngiz Əlizadə, Russian Франгиз Али-Заде; born 29 May 1947 in Baku, Azerbaijani SSR, Soviet Union) is an Azerbaijani composer and pianist,and currently living in Germany. She is best known for her works that combine the musical tradition of the Azerbaijani mugham and 20th century Western compositional techniques, especially those of Arnold Schoenberg and Gara Garayev. Her works have been performed by Yo-Yo Ma, Hilary Hahn, and the Kronos Quartet. On June 20, 2007, Ali-Zadeh was elected chair of the Composers' Union of Azerbaijan.

Also, she was author of Karabakhname opera.

Social activities
She is the artistic director of the International World of Mugham Festival.

Discography

 "Mugam Sayagi", on Kronos Quartet: Night Prayers, Nonesuch (1994)
 La Strimpellata Bern: Crossings: Music by Frangiz Ali-Zade, BIS (1997)
 "Habil-Sajahy for cello & prepared piano", on Yo-Yo Ma & The Silk Road Ensemble: Silk Road Journey - When Strangers Meet, Sony Classical (2002)
 Kronos Quartet: Mugam Sayagi: Music of Franghiz Ali-Zadeh, Nonesuch (2005)
 "Aşk Havasi", on Jessica Kuhn (cello): Giacinto Scelsi, Frangis Ali-Sade, Thorofon (2006)
 Hilary Hahn: Impulse, on In 27 Pieces: the Hilary Hahn Encores, Amazon MP3 download (2014)
 Konstantin Manaev: Ali-Zadeh: Chamber Music for Cello, GWK Records (2014)

Notes

References
 Julie Anne Sadie and Rhian Samuel: The Norton/Grove Dictionary of Women Composers (1995)
 Marina Lobanova: "Auf der Silk Road des kulturellen Dialogs. Die aserbaidschanische Komponistin Frangis Ali-sade". In: "Neue Zeitschrift für Musik" 2000, Heft 4, S. 21-25
 Neil Edmunds: Soviet Music and Society Under Lenin and Stalin (2004)
 Inna Naroditskaya: Song From the Land of Fire: Azerbaijanian Mugam in the Soviet and Post-Soviet Periods, Routledge (2003)

External links
 
 Work list by Schirmer.com (2006)
 Interview with Azerbaijan International (7.4), Winter 1999.
 List of works compiled by Onno van Rijen (2006)
 Biography at Sikorski.de
 Short biography at Silk Road Project

20th-century classical composers
21st-century classical composers
Azerbaijani women composers
Azerbaijani women pianists
Azerbaijani musicologists
Women musicologists
Azerbaijani music educators
People's Artists of Azerbaijan
Soviet Azerbaijani people
Musicians from Baku
Azerbaijani emigrants to Germany
Baku Academy of Music alumni
Living people
Women classical composers
1947 births
21st-century pianists
20th-century women composers
21st-century women composers
Recipients of the Azerbaijan Democratic Republic 100th anniversary medal
Honored Art Workers of the Azerbaijan SSR
20th-century women pianists
21st-century women pianists